Ray Wylie Hubbard (born November 13, 1946) is an American singer and songwriter.

Early life
Hubbard was born in the town of Soper, Oklahoma. His family moved to Oak Cliff in southwest Dallas, Texas, in 1954.  He attended W. H. Adamson High School with Michael Martin Murphey. Hubbard graduated in 1965 and enrolled in North Texas State University (now the University of North Texas) as an English major. He spent the summers in Red River, New Mexico, playing folk music in hootenannies with a trio known as Three Faces West.

Musical career

1970s
During his time in New Mexico, Hubbard wrote "Up Against the Wall, Redneck Mother" first made famous by Jerry Jeff Walker's 1973 recording, and covered by a wide variety of other artists since.  Bolstered by the success of the song, he was signed by Warner Bros. Records. Hubbard then assembled a band of friends and locals and, in 1976, released Ray Wylie Hubbard and the Cowboy Twinkies. Unbeknownst to Hubbard, producer Michael Brovsky had decided to "Nashville-ize" the sound by adding overdub mixes and female backup singers to the recordings. The result was "a botched sound" that Hubbard disapproved of vehemently, but the album was released despite his attempts to block it.

1980s
Hubbard then recorded albums for various other labels for the next decade, but struggled with the sales of his mix of country, folk and blues. The last album he recorded in the 80s was Caught in the Act (1984) on his newly formed Misery Loves Company record label.

1990s and beyond
He returned to recording in the early 1990s, and released his album Lost Train of Thought in 1992, followed by Loco Gringo's Lament in 1994. Eventually a steady following began to re-discover Hubbard's music and he has been recording steadily since.
His guitar technique uses a strumming by the left (fretting) hand that is very old, but not frequently seen in double time without changing right hand beat.

He describes his 2017 album Tell the Devil I’m Getting There as Fast as I Can as rock & roll, though his style has become associated with outlaw country, which he pans in the song "Lucifer and the Fallen Angels" singing, "Why go to Nashville knowing you never, ever gonna be mainstream? It’s better to reign in hell than serve in heaven."

Discography
 1975 Ray Wylie Hubbard and the Cowboy Twinkies – Warner Bros. Records 
 1978 Off the Wall – Lone Star Records/Mercury/Polygram
 1979 Something About the Night – Renegade Records
 1984 Caught in the Act – Misery Loves Company Records
 1992 Lost Train of Thought – Misery Loves Company/DejaDisc Records 
 1994 Loco Gringo's Lament – Misery Loves Company/DejaDisc Records
 1997 Dangerous Spirits – Rounder/Philo Records
 1998 Live at Cibolo Creek – Misery Loves Company Records 
 1999 Crusades of the Restless Knights – Rounder/Philo Records 
 2001 Eternal and Lowdown – Rounder/Philo Records
 2003 Growl – Rounder/Philo Records
 2005 Delirium Tremolos – Rounder/Philo Records
 2006 Snake Farm – Sustain Records
 2010 A. Enlightenment B. Endarkenment (Hint: There is No C) – Bordello Records (Thirty Tigers/RED) 
 2012 The Grifter's Hymnal – Bordello Records (Thirty Tigers/RED)
 2015 The Ruffian's Misfortune – Bordello Records (Thirty Tigers/RED)
 2017 Tell the Devil That I'm Getting There As Fast As I Can – Bordello Records (Thirty Tigers/RED)
 2020 Co-Starring – Big Machine Records
 2022 Co-Starring Too – Big Machine Records - Released March 18, 2022

Books
 A Life... Well, Lived – A biography and memoir published in 2015.

See also
 Folk Music Club

References

External links 

 THE SECOND LIFE OF RAY WYLIE HUBBARD from D Magazine (1993)
 A Country Music Outlaw, Resurrected NPR July 24, 2006
  Hubbard's Path: 'Redneck Mother' to 'Wylie Lama' NPR September 17, 2006
 The Resurrection of Ray Wylie Hubbard: The Turnstyled Junkpiled Interview (2012)
 Ray Wylie Hubbard at The Kessler Theater in Dallas, TX : Ray Wylie Hubbard celebrated his 70th Birthday Bash with special guests Larry Campbell and Teresa Williams by David Simers in National Rock Review (November 24, 2016)
 The 25 Best Ray Wylie Hubbard Songs by Thomas Mooney in Wide Open Country (March 2018)

1946 births
Living people
People from Hugo, Oklahoma
Country musicians from Oklahoma
Country musicians from Texas
American country singer-songwriters
Musicians from Dallas
University of North Texas alumni
Music of Denton, Texas
Singer-songwriters from Texas
Singer-songwriters from Oklahoma
People from Oak Cliff, Texas